Lestes henshawi is a species of spreadwing in the damselfly family Lestidae. It is found in Central America and South America.

The IUCN conservation status of Lestes henshawi is "LC", least concern, with no immediate threat to the species' survival. The population is stable. The IUCN status was reviewed in 2009.

References

Further reading

 

Lestes
Articles created by Qbugbot
Insects described in 1907